164 Eva is a main-belt asteroid that was discovered by the French brothers Paul Henry and Prosper Henry on July 12, 1876, in Paris. The reason the name Eva was chosen remains unknown. The orbital elements for 164 Eva were published in 1877 by American astronomer Winslow Upton. It is categorized as a C-type asteroid and is probably composed of primitive carbonaceous chondritic materials.

Photometric observations of this asteroid at the Palmer Divide Observatory in Colorado Springs, Colorado, during 2008 gave a light curve with a period of 13.672 ± 0.003 hours and a small brightness variation of 0.04 ± 0.01 in magnitude. This is consistent with a previous study reported in 1982 that listed a period estimate of 13.66 hours.

Between 2000 and 2021, 164 Eva has been observed to occult fourteen stars. 

With a perihelion of 1.718 AU 164 Eva is the closest asteroid over 100 kilometers to approach the orbit of Mars. Its closest approach is about 0.05 AU or about 19.5 lunar distances.

References

External links 
 Lightcurve plot of 164 Eva, Palmer Divide Observatory, B. D. Warner (2008)
 Asteroid Lightcurve Database (LCDB), query form (info )
 Dictionary of Minor Planet Names, Google books
 Asteroids and comets rotation curves, CdR – Observatoire de Genève, Raoul Behrend
 Discovery Circumstances: Numbered Minor Planets (1)-(5000) – Minor Planet Center
 
 

Background asteroids
Eva
Eva
CX-type asteroids (Tholen)
X-type asteroids (SMASS)
18760712
Objects observed by stellar occultation